Hunters Quay Hotel is a hotel located on Marine Parade in Hunters Quay, Argyll and Bute, Scotland. It is a Category C listed building, built around 1870. It sits a few feet to the south of the Royal Marine Hotel.

The building was known as Claver House on the first edition Ordnance Survey map (1862–1877).

References

External links
HUNTERS QUAY, MARINE PARADE, HUNTERS QUAY HOTEL - Historic Environment Scotland
Dunoon, Hunter's Quay, 247 Marine Parade, Glen Tower Hotel - Canmore.org.uk

Buildings and structures in Hunters Quay
Category C listed buildings in Argyll and Bute
Listed hotels in Scotland
Hotels in Argyll and Bute